On the evening of September 2, 1984 (Labour Day) several tornadoes hit southwestern Ontario from Windsor to London. This was the biggest severe weather event of the year for the province. During the morning hours, the surface map revealed a rather potent low pressure system (for late summer) over northern Michigan, moving to the northeast.

Areas affected by the EF4-scale tornadoes included Barrie. 

A warm front was moving into southern Ontario and bringing with it a moist, unstable airmass. Thunderstorms were also reported across much of district during the early morning hours as well. The cold front however, was still back over Lake Michigan and tracking steadily towards the east. During the afternoon, the weather generally cleared up in the outbreak area and temperatures reached the upper 20s Celsius (low 80s F) with dewpoints in the low 20s Celsius (low 70s F).

The tornadoes
Towards 4:00 pm the cold front was starting to cross the border and thunderstorms began to form over the southern portion of Lake Huron. A tornado was reported near Lakeport, Michigan (where F3 damage occurred) at around 4:30 pm but continued over the lake as a waterspout, before weakening. In Ontario, the first tornado touchdowns were near Melrose (just northwest of London) and at Forest (Lambton County) at 6:00 and 6:20 pm, respectively. Both of these tornadoes were relatively brief.

The next tornadoes occurred near the towns of Staffa and Sebringville (in northern Perth County) at around 6:30 and 7:15 pm, respectively. These tornadoes were likely associated with the same thunderstorm (possibly a supercell, cyclic in nature) as they occurred only within a few kilometres of each other.

At 7:20 pm, the most damaging tornado touched down just southwest of London, where it proceeded to rip through the White Oaks subdivision at the southern end of the city (not too far from Highway 401). Approximately 600 homes were damaged and 30 people were injured as a result. Over the northern portion of the city, torrential downpours dropped 40–60 mm of rain in about an hour and were accompanied by gusty winds. There was one last brief touchdown near Bothwell (northeast of Thamesville, Kent County) shortly after the London Tornado lifted.

None of the six tornadoes were assigned official F-scale ratings by Environment Canada but the London Tornado was almost certainly significant (F2 or higher intensity).

References

External links
Neighbourhood Feature: White Oaks
OntarioWeather Tornado Database
Canadian Climate Data, Environment Canada

Tornadoes in Ontario
Tornadoes in Michigan
1984 disasters in Canada
Tornadoes of 1984
1984 in Ontario
September 1984 events in Canada
1984-09-02